Poliana micra is a moth of the family Sphingidae. It is known from arid scrubland from Somalia to eastern Kenya.

The length of the forewings is 22–28 mm. The body is grey, mottled and faintly spotted with darker and lighter grey. The forewings are grey with crenulated darker transverse lines, and a small whitish stigma. The Hindwings are uniform grey.

References

Sphingini
Moths described in 1903
Moths of Africa